Driffield railway station serves the town of Driffield in the East Riding of Yorkshire, England. It is located on the Yorkshire Coast Line and is operated by Northern, providing all passenger train services.

History
The station was opened by the York and North Midland Railway on 6 October 1846, at the same time as the line from Hull to Bridlington. The independent Malton & Driffield Railway company obtained parliamentary approval to build a branch line between there and Malton in the same year, but more than six years would pass before it was ready for traffic, the first train running in May 1853.

This was never more than a rural branch line, but the final route into the town, from Selby via Market Weighton (opened on 1 May 1890), proved rather more important as it soon became busy with holiday traffic from the West Riding heading for the resorts further up the coast. Today, though only the original coast line remains in use, the Malton line having succumbed to road competition as long ago as June 1950, the Selby line falling victim to the Beeching Axe almost exactly fifteen years later (closing on 14 June 1965).

Station Masters

Francis Warwick 1846 – 1883
Thomas House 1883 – 1902
John Mace/Mais 1902 – 1920
William James Chapman 1920 – 1925 (formerly station master at Market Weighton)
E.H. Fowler 1925 – 1932 (afterwards station master at Northallerton)
Thomas E. Allen 1932 – 1936 (afterwards station master at Bridlington)
James T. Batty 1936 – 1942 (afterwards station master at Beverley)
James Dennis 1942 – 1944 (afterwards station master at Beverley)
E.W. Hope 1944 – ????
H. Mattison 1946 – 1951 (formerly station master at Leyburn, afterwards station master at Malton)
H. Bradshaw 1951 – 1953
A.R. Binner 1953 (formerly station master at Newsham)
F. Newlove 1956 – 1961 (formerly station master at Church Fenton, afterwards station master at Malton)
L. Haigh 1961 – ???? (formerly station master at Bubwith)

Facilities
The station is staffed part-time, with the ticket office open from 07:15 to 13:30 six days per week (closed on Sundays).  A ticket machine is also available.  Waiting rooms are provided on both platforms.  Train running information is offered by digital information screens, telephone and timetable posters.  Both platforms have step-free access.

Services

The station has a twice hourly service in each direction to Hull and Bridlington on weekdays, with alternate northbound trains continuing on to Scarborough. There is an hourly service each way on Sundays to Scarborough and Sheffield throughout the year (rather than in summer only) since the timetable change in December 2009.

Notes

References

External links

 Driffield station at The Yorkshire Wolds Railway Restoration Project
 

Railway stations in the East Riding of Yorkshire
DfT Category F1 stations
Railway stations in Great Britain opened in 1846
Northern franchise railway stations
Stations on the Hull to Scarborough line
1846 establishments in England
Former York and North Midland Railway stations
George Townsend Andrews railway stations
Driffield